Sara R. Stevens (born 1974) is an American politician from Maine. A member of the Democratic Party, Stevens served as a member of the Maine House of Representatives, representing part of Bangor from 2008 to 2012. Stevens withdrew in June 2012 following an uncontested primary. She was replaced by Victoria Kornfield, who was then elected to replace Stevens in November.

Education
Stevens attended Syracuse University before graduating with a B.A. from the University of Maine in 1996. In 1999, Stevens graduated with an MS in Human Development from the University of Maine.

References

1974 births
Living people
Politicians from Bangor, Maine
Democratic Party members of the Maine House of Representatives
Syracuse University alumni
University of Maine alumni
Women state legislators in Maine
21st-century American women